Potamotrygon schuhmacheri, the Parana river stingray, is a species of fish in the family Potamotrygonidae. It is found in the Paraná and Paraguay River basins in Argentina, Paraguay, and possibly Brazil. Its natural habitat is rivers. It is threatened by habitat loss.

The fish is named in honor of a student in Castex’ former high-school and a collaborator, Roberto Schümacher (1947-1964), who died in an accident.

References

schuhmacheri
Freshwater fish of Argentina
Fish of Paraguay
Fauna of the Pantanal
Taxa named by Mariano N. Castex
Fish described in 1964
Taxonomy articles created by Polbot
Taxobox binomials not recognized by IUCN